The Gonocerini, synonym Gonocérates are a tribe of leaf-footed bugs, in the subfamily Coreinae.  The type genus is Gonocerus Berthold, 1827; genera are distributed from Africa, Europe to South-East Asia and Australia.

Genera 
The Coreoidea Species File lists:
 Brotheolus Bergroth, 1908
 Brunsellius Distant, 1902
 Cletoliturus Brailovsky, 2011
 Cletomorpha Mayr, 1866
 Cletoscellus Brailovsky, 2011
 Cletus Stål, 1860
 Gonocerus Berthold, 1827
 Junodis Van Reenen, 1976
 Plinachtus Stål, 1860
 Pseudotheraptus Brown, 1955
 Trallianus Distant, 1902

References

External links
 
 

Hemiptera tribes
Coreinae